Argentat-sur-Dordogne (literally Argentat on Dordogne) is a commune in the department of Corrèze, south-central France. The municipality was established on 1 January 2017 by merger of the former communes of Argentat (the seat) and Saint-Bazile-de-la-Roche.

Geography

Location
Located in the Massif Central, at the confluence of the Maronne with the Dordogne river, it is at the southern end of the Faille d'Argentat. To the east, the town is bordered by the Doustre, and to the west it is watered by the Souvigne..

The town of Argentat is situated on the edge of three regions, the Limousin, the Auvergne and the Quercy, on the Dordogne river after it has crossed deep gorges. Argentat is located in the western part of the Xaintrie in the small Bas-Limousin.

From this geographical situation arises the interest of the town: passage of the Dordogne on the one hand, and port for important river traffic towards Bergerac and Libourne.

Population

Local culture and heritage

 La Maison du Patrimoine.
 St. Peter's Church.
 The convent of the Récollets, founded in the early seventeenth century.
 The Cross of the Gabariers (bargemen).
 The Quai Maçonné Lestourgie - 19th century quay (1844) with a nice promenade, on the right bank of the Dordogne.
 The Clarisses Convent, 7 Rue des Clarisses.
 L'hôtel de Turenne, la " Raymondie ", 13 Rue des Clarisses.
 The Chapel built at the end of the 19th century, Rue des Clarisses.
 The rue Porte-Basse.
 The house where General Antoine Guillaume Delmas was born and his bust (1906) by Eugène-Jean Boverie.
 La Maison Filliol (16th century), former relay post
 Le Manoir de Eyrial (1457).
 Château Neuville, also known as Château Fénelon,.
 Le Château du Bac: 18th century façade, 16th century dovecote.
 La Chapelle-aux-Plats, a former parish merged with the commune Argentat. His castle belonged to a branch of the Pestels family.
 The Barrage d'Argentat {dam} and the Château du Gibanel
 Bridge over the Maronne river

See also 
Communes of the Corrèze department

References 

Communes of Corrèze
Populated places established in 2017
2017 establishments in France